Mindaugas Umaras (born 1 July 1968) is a Lithuanian cyclist. He competed in the team pursuit event at the 1988 Summer Olympics winning a gold medal.

References

External links
 

1968 births
Living people
Lithuanian male cyclists
Soviet male cyclists
Olympic cyclists of the Soviet Union
Olympic cyclists of Lithuania
Cyclists at the 1988 Summer Olympics
Cyclists at the 1996 Summer Olympics
Medalists at the 1988 Summer Olympics
Olympic medalists in cycling
Olympic gold medalists for the Soviet Union
Sportspeople from Kaunas